Woltersdorf (Nuthe-Urstromtal) station is a railway station in the municipality of Woltersdorf (Nuthe-Urstromtal), located in the Teltow-Fläming district in Brandenburg, Germany.

References

Railway stations in Brandenburg
Buildings and structures in Teltow-Fläming